Guerrero is a municipality located in the Mexican state of Tamaulipas.

Towns and villages

The largest localities (cities, towns, and villages) are:

Adjacent municipalities and counties

 Mier Municipality - southeast and south
 Parás Municipality, Nuevo León - southwest
 Vallecillo Municipality, Nuevo León - southwest
 Anáhuac Municipality, Nuevo León - west
 Nuevo Laredo Municipality - northwest
 Webb County, Texas - northeast
 Zapata County, Texas - east
 Starr County, Texas - southeast

References

External links

Gobierno Municipal de Guerrero Official website 

Municipalities of Tamaulipas